"Make It Right" is a song recorded by the British singer, Lisa Stansfield, for the 1994 soundtrack to the American drama series, Beverly Hills, 90210. It was written by Rhett Lawrence, Crystal Bernard and Suzie Benson, and produced by Lawrence and Ian Devaney.

Release
It was released as a promotional single in the United States on 5 September 1994. Therefore, it was not eligible to chart on the Billboard Hot 100. However, "Make It Right" reached number forty-six on the Hot Dance Club Songs chart and sixty four on the Hot R&B Singles chart. The CD single was released in Germany on 2 October 1994 but failed to chart because of lack of promotion and no music video. "Make It Right" was also issued as a mini CD single in Japan on 23 November 1994. The song was remixed by R. Kelly, Kenny "Dope" Gonzalez and Rhett Lawrence. "Make It Right" was not included on any of Stansfield's albums.

Critical reception
Larry Flick from Billboard described the song as a "Stansfield jam that is stronger than anything she has offered in a long while." He noted that she "excels amid a flurry of jack/funk beats and whispery backing vocals. Her fluid vocal tones flow freely over a hummable melody." Dave Sholin from the Gavin Report commented, "School's almost in session, and it coincides with release of the sequel to the Beverly Hills 90210 Soundtrack: Volume 2 The College Years. Lisa Stansfield is a brilliant choice to pair with this song. R. Kelly's re-mix is the one for Top 40."

Track listings
German CD maxi single
"Make It Right" (Album Version) – 3:57
"Make It Right" (R. Kelly Remix) – 4:04
"Make It Right" (R. Kelly Groove Remix) – 3:42
"Make It Right" (R. Kelly Extended Groove Remix) – 5:19
"Make It Right" (Rhetro G-Mix) – 4:16

Japanese CD single
"Make It Right" (R. Kelly Remix) – 4:04
"Make It Right" (R. Kelly Extended Groove Remix) – 5:19

US promotional CD single
"Make It Right" (Album Version) – 3:57
"Make It Right" (Alternate Bridge) – 3:57

US promotional CD maxi single
"Make It Right" (Kenny Dope Remix) – 3:58
"Make It Right" (Kenny Dope Extended Remix) – 5:58
"Make It Right" (Single Version) – 3:57
"Make It Right" (R. Kelly Remix) – 4:04
"Make It Right" (R. Kelly Extended Groove Remix) – 5:19
"Make It Right" (Rhetro G-Mix) – 4:16

Charts

References

Lisa Stansfield songs
1994 singles
Songs written by Rhett Lawrence
Songs written by Crystal Bernard
1994 songs
Song recordings produced by Rhett Lawrence